Tham Lod Rockshelter, first researched by Rasmi Shoocongdej from Silpakorn University, funded by the Thai Research Fund, was a prehistoric cemetery and a workshop located in Northern Thailand known to have human inhabitants from the late Pleistocene to the late Holocene period Additionally, Tham Lod is near Ban Rai, another rock shelter and is in the vicinity of two well known caves, Spirit Cave and Tham Lot cave. Recent researches and carbon dating suggested that Homo sapiens have occupied the area. These researches provide more detail on the activities by the humans in the area which includes burials, living habits, gathering, and tool making, and social interactions.

Human activity

In recent years, there have been multiple researches at the Tham Lod rockshelter which have been protected by the Ambassador's Fund for Cultural Preservation since 2001. These researches have been aimed toward analyzing the culture from the three periods humans lived in the Tham Lod rockshelter (Late Pleistocene, Early Holocene, and Late Holocene). An excavation at the Tham Lod rockshelter from 2001 to 2002 provided important knowledge of the past environment based from the analysis from collected pollen data. Pollen that is collected can be analyzed for an insight on the climate of the past, as it can survive for over 100,000 years under specific conditions. The pollen analysis suggested that humans have impacted the environment, especially the vegetation in Tham Lod, for instance using ferns for medicinal reasons. Deforestation in the area in the past may also be caused by humans.

Human occupation

A study in Northwest Thailand, in particular Tham Lod funded by the Australian National University's Graduate School and Center for Archaeological Research and the Australian Institute for Nuclear Science and Engineering, conducted by Ben Marwick dates human occupation in Tham Lod from 40,000 BP to 10,000 BP. The population was highest during the Holocene period where biomass was greater because of the wet climate. Additionally migrants from China may have contributed to the population increase.

Hunting and tool making

The structure of Tham Lod indicates an ambush hunting strategy by humans that once occupied the area. Ben Marwick's study of Tham Lod found that there were a considerable amount of stone artifacts which supports that humans occupied the area at an estimated minimum number of 1722 artifacts. In fact, for the most of Tham Lod there were indications that the area was primarily an ancient tool workshop. The materials that may have been utilized to make the tools found were sandstone, quartzite, mudstone, andesite, siltstone, and slate; these tools included chopper-chopping tools, scrapers, sumatraliths (a typical artefact of the Hoabinhian), short-axes, disks, and utilized flakes. Despite the different amount of tools that were made, there were other variations in stone artifacts from different layers may have a correlation to trade activity among the humans that once lived in Tham Lod.

Burials

The Tham Lod rockshelter was discovered to contain multiple bodies that were buried in the past by humans. This discovery was made by a research carried out by Rasmi Shoocongdej of the Highland Archaeology Project funded by the US Ambassador Fund for Cultural Preservation in 2006. There were two of which had significant traces of possible human culture at the time. These bodies were buried in levels above one another (the undetermined skeleton was above the female skeleton). The first skeleton, with an undetermined gender was found in an extended burial  underground and the age was 12,100 +/- 60 years BP. The undetermined skeleton was found to be buried with shellfish and land snails, while the female skeleton had plants, flakes and a hammer stone.

Paleoenvironment

A study in 2006 conducted by Suwongpong Wattanapituksakul of Chulongcorn University at Tham Lod in the Mae Hong Son Province described the environment from 35,000 to 10,000 BP to stay the same as the same animals that thrived in that area existed until 10,000 BP. Suwongpong analyzed data from mammal teeth found in Tham Lod to find 2003 number of identified specimens, which were then classified into 31 taxa. These animals included: Rhinocerotidae, Rhizomyidae, Rhizomys spp., Cannomys badius, Bandicota spp., and Bandicota indica. Animals such as the Rhinocerotidae required a specialized habitat, indicating that the environment was a dense forest for until 10,000 BP. The climate of the Tham Lod Rockshelter from the δ18O data collected by Ben Marwick and Michael K. Gagan, funded by a University Postgraduate Award, the Australian Institute of Nuclear Science and Engineering and the ANU Department of Archaeology and Natural History, for the ANU Department of Archaeology and Natural History in the Research School of Pacific and Asian Studies, showed that from 35,000 to 20,000BP the climate was wet and varied, then from 20,000 to 11,500 BP, it was dry; after 11,500 BP, the climate did not show any variation and became more wet. Furthermore, the forest around the Tham Lod rockshelter from the late Pleistocene period is still the same today.

See also
 Spirit Cave, Thailand
 History of Thailand
 Prehistoric Thailand

References

Further reading
 Okamura, K., & Matsuda, A. (2001). Public Archaeology in Thailand. New Perspectives in Global Public Archaeology. New York: Springer.
 Cummings, V., Jordan, P., & Zvelebil, M. (2014). Central Thailand. The Oxford Handbook of the Archaeology and Anthropology of Hunter-Gatherers. Oxford: Oxford University Press.
 Gunn, J. (2004). Asia, Southeast: Archaeological Caves. Encyclopedia of Caves and Karst Science. New York: Taylor & Francis Books.
 Marwick, B. (2009). Biogeography of Middle Pleistocene hominins in mainland Southeast Asia: A review of current evidence. Quaternary International 202 (2009) 51–58
 Marwick, B. (2008). Stone artefacts and recent research in the archaeology of mainland Southeast Asian hunter-gatherers. Before Farming 2008/4
 Juskalian, R. (2011, October 7). Caves and Kayaks in a Quiet Corner of Thailand. The New York Times: Travel, p. TR4. Retrieved from https://www.nytimes.com/2011/10/09/travel/ban-tham-lod-in-northern-thailand.html?pagewanted=all&_r=0

External links
 , Geographical analysis of prehistoric sites.

Archaeological sites in Thailand
Prehistoric Thailand